Unorganized North East Parry Sound District is an unorganized area in Parry Sound District in Central Ontario, Canada. It is served by the local services board of Laurier and is part of the Almaguin Highlands region. The region had a population of 179 in the Canada 2021 Census, and a land area of 183.04 square kilometres.

Etymology
The geographic township of Laurier in Parry Sound District was named in 1878 for Wilfrid (later Sir Wilfrid) Laurier (1841-1919), then minister of inland revenue in Alexander Mackenzie's government and later Prime Minister of Canada, 1896-1911.

Transportation
The Canadian National Railway transcontinental main line and Ontario Highway 11 travel a roughly parallel course from the middle of the western edge to the centre of the northern edge of the township.

References

Other map sources:

External links
Almaguin Highlands Communities, Almaguin Highlands Regional Portal

Local services boards in Ontario
Parry Sound North East
Geography of Parry Sound District